Stone Bridge was a bridge in Tartu, Estonia. 

The bridge was opened on 16 September 1784. The bridge was built on the orders of Empress Catherine II of Russia.

The bridge was destroyed during WWII in 1941. Today, Kaarsild stands where the bridge used to be.

There are plans to restore the bridge to its original glory.

References

Bridges in Tartu
18th-century architecture in Estonia
History of Tartu
Bridges completed in 1784
Estonia in World War II